Tyler Polumbus (born April 10, 1985) is a former American football offensive tackle. He was signed by the Denver Broncos as an undrafted free agent in 2008. He played college football at the University of Colorado at Boulder.

In addition to the Broncos, Polumbus has been a member of the Detroit Lions, Seattle Seahawks, Washington Redskins, and Atlanta Falcons.

Early years
Polumbus played football for Cherry Creek High School in Greenwood Village, Colorado.  He was named a SuperPrep All-American in 2002.

College career
From 2003 to 2007, Polumbus played for the University of Colorado.  After his senior year, league coaches named Polumbus All-Big 12 second team.

Professional career

Denver Broncos

On April 29, 2008, the Denver Broncos signed Polumbus as an undrafted free agent. He made his NFL debut in Week 1 against the Oakland Raiders. He finished the 2008 season playing in all 16 games as a backup lineman.

Polumbus had his first career start in Week 9 against the Pittsburgh Steelers. By the end of the season, he had played in 15 games and started eight of them.

Polumbus was waived by the team on August 24, 2010.

Detroit Lions
Polumbus was claimed off waivers by the Detroit Lions on August 25, 2010.

Seattle Seahawks
On August 31, 2010, the Lions traded Polumbus to the Seattle Seahawks for an undisclosed draft pick. He started at left tackle his first two games in place of injured Russell Okung. He played in 15 games, starting 7 of them, by the end of the 2010 season.

After playing five games in the 2011 season, the Seahawks waived him on October 25, 2011.

Washington Redskins
On November 9, 2011, the Washington Redskins signed Polumbus to the 53-man roster.
In Week 11 against the Dallas Cowboys, Polumbus would start as the left guard subbing in for Maurice Hurt. Polumbus would unexpectedly start as the right tackle in Week 15 after Jammal Brown suffered a groin injury during pre-game warmups.
At the end of the 2011 season, he played a total of five games, starting four of them.

During 2012 training camp, Polumbus split snaps at right tackle with Maurice Hurt and Willie Smith after Jammal Brown was placed on the physically unable to perform (PUP) list. After starting at right tackle during the first three preseason games, he was officially announced as the starting right tackle for the opening of the 2012 season after Brown had hip surgery on August 27. On October 26, Polumbus was fined $7,875 for a leg whip in Week 7. In Week 15 against the Cleveland Browns, he was forced to leave the game early after suffering a concussion. He would miss the next game against the Philadelphia Eagles due to this concussion.

Set to become a free agent in the 2013 season, Polumbus agreed to a new two-year contract with the Redskins on March 18, 2013.

Polumbus began the 2014 season as the starting right offensive tackle. Before the Week 8 game against the Dallas Cowboys, it was announced by head coach Jay Gruden that Polumbus would be benched in favor of Tom Compton.

Atlanta Falcons
On May 14, 2015, the Atlanta Falcons signed Polumbus. On September 29, 2015, the Falcons released Polumbus.

Second stint with Broncos
On October 1, 2015, just two days after being released by the Falcons, the Denver Broncos signed Polumbus to a one-year deal.

On February 7, 2016, Polumbus was part of the Broncos team that won Super Bowl 50. In the game, the Broncos defeated the Carolina Panthers by a score of 24–10.

Post retirement
Polumbus hosts a sports-talk radio show in Denver on Altitude Sports Radio 92.5. On October 24, 2022, Polumbus started his role as part of the Polumbus, Hastings, and Dover show.

References

External links

Official website
Washington Redskins bio
Colorado Buffaloes bio
NFL Combine Profile
ESPN player bio

1985 births
Living people
Players of American football from Denver
American football offensive tackles
Colorado Buffaloes football players
Denver Broncos players
Detroit Lions players
Seattle Seahawks players
Washington Redskins players
Atlanta Falcons players